M106 or M-106 may refer to:
 M106 (New York City bus), a New York City Bus route in Manhattan
 M-106 (Michigan highway), a state highway in Michigan
 BMW M106, a motor 
 Messier 106, a spiral galaxy about in the constellation Canes Venatici
 Klimov VK-106 or M-106 aircraft engine
 M106 mortar carrier a tracked, self-propelled artillery vehicle formerly in service with the United States Army

nl:M106